Vuolo is a surname, and may refer to:

Jeremy Vuolo (born 1987), American soccer player 
Jinger Vuolo (born 1993), American television personality 
Lindsey Vuolo (born 1981), American model
Tito Vuolo (1893–1962), Italian-American actor